Acacia pachycarpa is a tree or shrub belonging to the genus Acacia and the subgenus Juliflorae that is endemic to central and western parts of northern Australia.

The Walmajarri people of the Paruku IPA in the Kimberley call this wattle Parrayari.

Description
It can have a single or many stems and can form a large crowns when growing in favourable conditions. It has hard dark grey coloured bark that is furrowed on main stems but becomes smooth and light grey on the upper branches. It has brittle, glabrous and grey coloured branches. Like most species of Acacia it has phyllodes rather than true leaves. The thinly coriaceous phyllodes resemble a strap and are straight to curved and glabrous with one to five widely spaced main longitudinal nerves with many indistinct minor nerves. It flowers from May to June producing cream-white flowers.

Distribution
It is native to Pilbara and Kimberley regions of Western Australia with the range extending into western parts of the top end and central parts of the Northern Territory. It has a scattered distribution with the bulk of the population situated in the Tanami Desert straddling the border between Western Australian and the Northern Territory. Disjunct populations are found near Onslow from Yanrey Station to Minderoo Station and around Telfer. It is often found in cracking clay pans and in clay depressions along drainage lines but also in sandy alluvium type soils in minor watercourses and in clay or sandy loam soils.
List of Acacia species

References

pachycarpa
Acacias of Western Australia
Flora of the Northern Territory
Plants described in 1864
Taxa named by George Bentham